Papini is an Italian surname.  

Notable people with the surname include:

 Federico Papini (born 1999), Italian footballer
 Giovanni Papini (18811956), Italian writer
 Guido Papini (18471912), Italian violinist
 Nicolas Papini ( 17511834), Italian monk and historian
 Romeo Papini (born 1983), Italian footballer
 Sherri Papini (born 1982), American woman who orchestrated a kidnapping hoax in California (2016)

See also 

 Giuseppe Paupini (19071992), Italian prelate of the Catholic Church

Italian-language surnames